Luberto da Montevarchi (1460-1522) was an Italian painter of the Renaissance period, active in the Valdarno.

He appears to have trained in the school of Pietro Perugino, and worked with him in decorating the Collegio del Cambio in Perugia. An arch of detached frescoes from the former church Sant'Andrea a Cennano are now on display in the Museo di Arte Sacra della Collegiata di San Lorenzo in Montevarchi.

References

People from the Province of Arezzo
Painters from Tuscany
1460 births
1522 deaths
15th-century Italian painters
Italian male painters
16th-century Italian painters
Italian Renaissance painters